State Road 249 (SR 249) is a part of the Indiana State Road that runs between Portage and Burns Harbor in the US state of Indiana.  The  of SR 249 that lie within Indiana serve as an access to the Port of Indiana. None of the highway is listed on the National Highway System. Most of the road is an urban four-lane divided highway, passing through farmland, residential and industrial properties.

Route description 
SR  249 heads north from the southern terminus at a traffic light with US 20. The highway is a four-lane divided highway, passing through commercial areas. After I–94, the route passes through residential properties and takes a sharp turn heading due east. During the curve, highway has a traffic light at Midwest Steel Access Road, with access to US 12. The road passes through farmland with a few industrial properties and begins to curves northeast. During the curve is an interchange with US 12. North of US 12 the road continues with SR 249, as George Nelson Drive and is only for traffic to and from the Port of Indiana. After George Nelson Drive passes over a set of railroad tracks is a permission gate.

No segment of State Road 249 in Indiana that is included in the National Highway System (NHS).  The NHS is a network of highways that are identified as being most important for the economy, mobility and defense of the nation.  The highway is maintained by the Indiana Department of Transportation (INDOT) like all other state roads in the state. The department tracks the traffic volumes along all state roads as a part of its maintenance responsibilities using a metric called average annual daily traffic (AADT). This measurement is a calculation of the traffic level along a segment of roadway for any average day of the year. In 2010, INDOT figured that lowest traffic levels were 10,366 vehicles and 398 commercial vehicles used the highway daily north of Midwest Steel Highway. The peak traffic volumes were 21,253 vehicles and 817 commercial vehicles AADT along the section of SR 249 between US 20 and I–94.

Major intersections

See also
Indiana State Road 49
Indiana State Road 149

References

External links

249
Northwest Indiana
Transportation in Porter County, Indiana